Montréal/Saint-Lazare Aerodrome  is a small, general aviation airport located adjacent to Saint-Lazare and approximately  west of Montreal Quebec, Canada.

See also
 List of airports in the Montreal area

References

Registered aerodromes in Montérégie
Transport in Vaudreuil-Soulanges Regional County Municipality